Joseph Francis Tolbert-Cook (July 27, 1912 – January 10, 1984), better known as Frank X. Tolbert, was a Texas journalist, historian, and chili enthusiast.  For the Dallas Morning News, he wrote a local history column called Tolbert's Texas that ran from 1946 until his death in 1984.

Biography
Tolbert was born in Amarillo, and was raised in Wichita Falls and Canyon.  He attended various colleges, but never received a degree.  He worked as a sports writer for the Lubbock Avalanche-Journal, the Wichita Falls Times Record News, and the Fort Worth Star-Telegram.  He also wrote articles that were published in Leatherneck Magazine, Collier's, Esquire, and the Saturday Evening Post.  He served in the U.S. Marine Corps during World War II, and married Kathleen Hoover in December 1943.  In 1946 he joined the Dallas Morning News, and became a regular columnist on Texas topics, including colorful Texas people from all walks of life.

He was also a food connoisseur, wrote a history of chili con carne called A Bowl of Red, and ran Tolbert's chili restaurant in Dallas.  In 1967 he founded, with Wick Fowler, the World Chili Championship held annually in Terlingua, Texas, which was later named for them. He appeared in several television commercials for Dennison's canned chili during the late 1970s.

He died of heart failure at age 71.  His son, Frank X. Tolbert II, is an artist and chili chef.  His daughter, Kathleen Tolbert Ryan, re-opened a Tolbert's Restaurant in May 2006 on Main Street in Grapevine, Texas.  Tolbert's Restaurant serves Frank X. Tolbert's famous chili recipe and has been named one of the "52 things Every Dallasite Must Do" by D Magazine  as well as one of the best chili spots in America by Bon Appetit magazine.

Books

Fiction
 Bigamy Jones (1954)
 The Staked Plain (1958) with Tom Pilkington, 1987, Southern Methodist University Press reprint, .

Non-fiction
 An Informal History of Texas (1951)
 Neiman-Marcus, Texas (1953)
 The Day of San Jacinto (1959) Jenkins Publishing.
 Dick Dowling at Sabine Pass (1962)
 A Bowl of Red (1972) Doubleday, .
 Tolbert's Texas (1983) Doubleday, .
 Tolbert of Texas: the Man and His Work (1986) ed. by Evelyn Oppenheimer, TCU Press, .

References

Journalists from Texas
1912 births
1984 deaths
United States Marines
United States Marine Corps personnel of World War II
People from Amarillo, Texas
Chefs from Texas
American male chefs
20th-century American historians
American male non-fiction writers
20th-century American journalists
American male journalists
Historians from Texas
20th-century American male writers